Ninian MacWhannell (15 October 1860 – 23 December 1939) was a Scottish architect, author, and footballer.

Born in Hutchesontown, MacWhannell attended Glasgow High School and Glasgow School of Art before becoming an architect.

He played football for Queen's Park, making five appearances for them, including appearing in the 1885 FA Cup Final.

He also wrote books about the Doric language and Robert Burns. He served as a councillor and magistrate.

References

1860 births
1939 deaths
Scottish footballers
Scottish architects
FA Cup Final players
Queen's Park F.C. players
Association football forwards
Footballers from Glasgow
Scottish writers
People educated at the High School of Glasgow
Alumni of the Glasgow School of Art
Councillors in Glasgow
People from Gorbals